Samuel Lawrence Taylor (June 26, 1942 – August 19, 2019) was an American bass guitarist, best known for his work as a member of Canned Heat from 1967. Before joining Canned Heat he had been a session bassist for The Monkees and Jerry Lee Lewis. He was the younger brother of Mel Taylor, long-time drummer of The Ventures.

Life and career 
Taylor was born in New York, New York. His mother was Jewish and his father was a "WASP" from Tennessee. Taylor played bass guitar in The Gamblers, one of the first rock groups to play instrumental surf music. Its personnel also included Elliot Ingber, a future member of Frank Zappa's Mothers of Invention, Fraternity of Man and Captain Beefheart's The Magic Band; Bruce Johnston, half of the Bruce and Terry duo with Terry Melcher from 1962–66 and longtime "sixth" member of The Beach Boys, for a time brother Mel Taylor, and guitarist-songwriter-bandleader Derry Weaver, who would record and perform in several capacities during the early 1960s. The Gamblers had a local hit in the Los Angeles area with "Moon Dawg" and Taylor played on the recording.

Taylor played with Canned Heat from 1967 to 1970, and appeared with them at various festivals including the Monterey International Pop Festival and Woodstock
.

His band nickname was "The Mole." In addition to playing bass, he also played lead guitar on occasion. An example can be heard on the track "Down in the Gutter, But Free", on the album Hallelujah. In 1969, due to a dispute with Taylor, Henry Vestine left the band. Guitarist Harvey Mandel filled the void as the band's lead guitarist. In 1970, when John Mayall moved to Los Angeles, Taylor and Mandel quit Canned Heat to join him in the Bluesbreakers. After the Bluesbreakers tours, Taylor played briefly with the Sugarcane Harris Band (later called Pure Food and Drug Act).

In 1974, Taylor became part of The Hollywood Fats Band led by Mike "Hollywood Fats" Mann. The pair joined Canned Heat for a King Biscuit Flower Hour concert in 1979. Taylor recorded Reheated in 1988, again with Canned Heat. He toured and recorded with his former band a few more times until 1999. In 2007, Taylor and Harvey Mandel reunited with Fito de la Parra and the rest of the current Canned Heat line-up to perform certain shows. Taylor, Mandel and de la Parra were all in the line-up that played Woodstock. The three members of Canned Heat's Woodstock line-up toured extensively from 2009 to 2013.

Taylor became a leading exponent and practitioner of the acoustic upright bass in the contemporary blues scene. He was quite prominently seen with his upright bass in the live blues film, Lightning in a Bottle. He was also featured in a concert DVD released in winter 2013, from the album Time Brings About A Change by Floyd Dixon. This concert features three elder piano players – Dixon, Pinetop Perkins and Henry Gray — and was filmed at the Rhythm Room in Phoenix, Arizona on 1 and 2 June 2006.

Taylor played on numerous Tom Waits albums and was the bass player in his touring band.

In 2014, Taylor was nominated for a Blues Music Award in the 'Best Instrumentalist – Bass' category. 

Larry Taylor died on 19 August 2019 at the age of 77 from cancer.

Discography

With The Monkees
 The Monkees (1966)
 More of the Monkees (1967)
 The Monkees Present (1969)
 Instant Replay (1969)
 Changes (1970)
 Listen to the Band (1991)
 Greatest Hits (1995)
 Missing Links, Vol. 3 (1996)
 Anthology (1998)
 Music Box (2001)

With Canned Heat
 Canned Heat (1967)
 Boogie with Canned Heat (1968)
 Living the Blues (1968)
 Hallelujah (1969)
 Future Blues (1970)
 Boogie Up the Country (1987)
 Reheated (1988)
 Internal Combustion (1994)
 Burnin'  (1994)
 Canned Heat Blues Band (1996)
 Gamblin' Woman (1996)
 King Biscuit Flower Hour: Canned Heat in Concert (1996)
 Ties That Bind (1997)
 Boogie 2000 (1999)
 Turning Up the Heat (2000)
 Live at the Kaleidoscope 1969 (2000)
 Far Out (2001)
 Big Road Blues (2002)
 Friends in the Can (2003)
 Canned Heat '70 Concert Live in Europe (2004)
 Dimples (2005)
 Canned, Labeled & Shelved (2006)
 Instrumentals 1967–1996 (2006)
 Christmas Album (2007)
  Revolution Limited Edition Cd (2012)
  Songs From The Road (2015)

With John Mayall
 Empty Rooms (1969)
 USA Union (1970)
 Back to the Roots (1971)
 Memories (1971)
 Jazz Blues Fusion (1972)
 Moving On (1973)
 Latest Edition (1974)
 New Year, New Band, New Company (1975)
 Notice to Appear (1975)
 Banquet in Blues (1976)
 Lots of People (1977)
 Archives to Eighties (1988)
 Rock the Blues Tonight (1999)

With Harvey Mandel
 Games Guitars Play (1970)
 Baby Batter (1971)
 Electronic Progress (1971)
 Snake (1972)
 Mercury Years (1995)

With Tom Waits
 Heartattack and Vine (1980)
 Swordfishtrombones (1983)
 Rain Dogs (1985)
 Franks Wild Years (1987)
 Bone Machine (1992)
 Mule Variations (1999) Gold Record Award
 Alice (2002)
 Blood Money (2002)
 Real Gone (2004)
 Bad as Me (2011)

With others
 Test Patterns (Boyce & Hart, 1967)
 Slim's Got His Thing Goin' On''' (Sunnyland Slim, 1969)
 Fiddler on the Rock (Don "Sugarcane" Harris, 1971)
 Lost Session (Albert King, 1971)
 Mudlark (Leo Kottke, 1971)
 Rock And Roll Forever (The Ventures, 1972)
 The Devil's Harmonica (Shakey Jake Harris, 1972)
 Cup Full of Dreams (Don "Sugarcane" Harris, 1974)
 Summit Meeting (Free Creek, 1976)
 I'm a Southern Man (Louis Myers, 1978)
 Hollywood Fats Band (Mike „Hollywood Fats“ Mann, 1979)
 Rock This House (Mike „Hollywood Fats“ Mann, 1979)
 Anthology Previously Unreleased Material (The Grandmothers, 1980)
 Rock Therapy (Colin Winski, 1980)
 The Other Side of Town (Chuck E. Weiss, 1981)
 Hard Line (The Blasters, 1985)
 Harpburn (Rod Piazza, 1986)
 Best (Leo Kottke, 1987)
 Kristen Vigard (Kristen Vigard, 1988)
 The Healer (John Lee Hooker, 1989)
 Keith Levene's Violent Opposition (Keith Levene, 1989)
 Mr. Lucky (John Lee Hooker, 1991)
 Got Love If You Want It (John P. Hammond, 1992)
 Trespass (Ry Cooder, 1992)
 In My Time (Charlie Musselwhite, 1992)
 Mother of an Anthology (The Grandmothers, 1993)
 That's Life (Kim Wilson, 1994)
 My New Orleans Soul (Ronnie Barron, 1994)
 Long Overdue (Junior Watson, 1994)
 Trouble No More (John P. Hammond, 1994)
 Martinis & Bikinis (Sam Phillips, 1994)
 Blues for Thought (Terry Evans, 1994)
 Closer to You (J. J. Cale, 1994)
 To Love (Randy Resnick, 1994)
 Working Girl Blues (Phillip Walker, 1995)
 88th Street Blues (Smokey Wilson, 1995)
 Adventures at Catfish Pond (Bob "Catfish" Hodge, 1996)
 Rough News (Charlie Musselwhite, 1997)
 Lost in America (Lynwood Slim, 1997)
 Mr. Blake's Blues (Al Blake, 1997)
 My Blues (Kim Wilson, 1997)
 Signifyin' (Fred Kaplan, 1997)
 Back to Back (Lynwood Slim, 1998)
 Lookin for Trouble (Edward Taylor, 1998)
 Jump Children! (Finis Tasby, 1998)
 New Depths (The Ventures, 1998)
 Soul Disguise (Cesar Rosas, 1999)
 Zero Zero Zero: The Best of Sam Phillips (Sam Phillips, 1999)
 Something Good for Your Head (Blackburn & Snow, 1999)
 I'm Going All the Way (Peggy Pruitt, 2000)
 I Can Tell (Junior Valentine, 2000)
 World Wide Wood (Lynwood Slim, 2000)
 Mo' Na'Kins, Please! (James Harman, 2000)
 Toughest Girl Alive (Candye Kane, 2000)
 West Coast House Party (Kid Ramos, 2000)
 There's a Song in There (Mark DuFresne, 2000)
 Fool's Paradise (Dale Hawkins, 2000)
 Wicked Grin (John P. Hammond, 2001)
 Smokin' Joint (Kim Wilson, 2001)
 "You Can Make It If You Try" (Gene Allison, 2002)
 Beggar's Oil (Kelly Joe Phelps, 2002)
 Harmonica Blues Orgy (Easy Baby, 2002)
 Magic Soul Elixer (Al Blake, 2002)
 Let It Rain (Tracy Chapman, 2002)
 Whole Lotta Love (Candye Kane, 2003)
 You've Never Seen Everything (Bruce Cockburn, 2003)
 Heart Trouble (Wanda Jackson, 2003)
 Villanelle (Paul Reddick, 2004)
 Fernando Ortega (Fernando Ortega, 2004)
 Think About It (Alex Schultz, 2004)
 Soul Sanctuary (Hollywood Blue Flames, 2005)
 Southern Jumbo (Colin Linden, 2005)
 Time Brings About a Change... A Floyd Dixon Celebration (Floyd Dixon, 2006)
 Hell Under the Skullbones (Graham Lindsey, 2006)
 Spooked (Marley's Ghost, 2006)
 Road to Rio (Hollywood Blue Flames, 2006)
 Can't Quit the Blues (Buddy Guy, 2006)
 Shower Some Love (Layni Kooper, 2007)
 Luminous (Chris Murphy, 2007)
 Big Plans (Mannish Boys, 2007)
 Like a Fire (Solomon Burke, 2008)
 Bluelisted (JW-Jones, 2008)
 Midnight Memphis Sun (JW-Jones, 2010)
 Definitive Albert King on Stax (Albert King, 2011)
 New World Generation (New World Generation, 2011)
 Driftin' From Town To Town (Barrelhouse Chuck & Kim Wilson's Blues All Stars (2013)
 Blues And Boogie'' (Kim Wilson) (2017)

References

External links

Larry Taylor Interview NAMM Oral History Library (2010)

1942 births
2019 deaths
American blues guitarists
American male guitarists
American rock bass guitarists
American male bass guitarists
American double-bassists
Jewish American musicians
Male double-bassists
Lead guitarists
Canned Heat members
John Mayall & the Bluesbreakers members
21st-century American politicians
Guitarists from New York City
20th-century American guitarists
21st-century double-bassists